Richmond station (officially the Richmond Transit Center) is a Amtrak intercity rail and Bay Area Rapid Transit (BART) station located in downtown Richmond, California. The accessible station has one island platform for the two BART tracks, with a second island platform serving two of the three tracks of the Union Pacific Railroad Martinez Subdivision for Amtrak trains. It is one of two transfer points between BART and Amtrak, along with Oakland Coliseum station.

The Southern Pacific (SP)-controlled Northern Railway opened through what is now Richmond in 1878. A flag stop at Barrett's Station was established by the mid-1880s; it was renamed Richmond in 1902 during the town's rapid growth. The SP constructed a new station at Richmond in 1904 and again in 1914–15. The SP station was demolished around 1968, though passenger continued until the formation of Amtrak in 1971. The Atchison, Topeka and Santa Fe Railway opened to Richmond in 1900; service ran until 1968, and the station was demolished in the 1990s.

The modern station opened on January 29, 1973, as the northern terminal of BART service. Controversies during planning included the station location and the design of the concourse. Amtrak service to the station began on October 30, 1977. A new Amtrak platform was built in 2001, followed by a renovation of the whole station completed in 2007. A parking garage replaced the surface parking lot in 2013.

Station design and services

Richmond station is located in Downtown Richmond in a large block bounded by Macdonald Avenue, Marina Way, Barrett Avenue, and 19th Street. The rail right-of-way runs diagonally (northwest–southeast) through the block at street level, with bridges over lowered sections of Macdonald Avenue and Barrett Avenue at the ends of the station. The BART platform – a single island platform with two tracks – is located on the east side of the station complex. The Amtrak platform – an island platform served by two of the three tracks of the Union Pacific Railroad Martinez Subdivision – is located to its west. It is served by the Capitol Corridor, San Joaquins, and California Zephyr routes.

A pedestrian concourse aligned with Nevin Avenue runs east–west under the tracks and platforms. Entrances from street level are located at both ends of the concourse. A semicircular "industrial post-modern" metal canopy covers the west entrance and a small retail building. A parking garage, a curved busway, and a kiss and ride lane are located on the southwest side of the station. Metro Walk, a mixed-use transit-oriented development, occupies the northwest corner of the block. The station is fully accessible, with elevators to both platforms and at both entrances.

The BART station was one of five designed by local firm Maher & Martens. Three pieces of public art are located around the station complex. A mosaic relief of marine life by William Mitchell, made of seashells and fiberglass, is in the BART paid area of the concourse. Architecture critic Dave Weinstein describes it as "rather disquieting" and "the strangest work at any BART station". On the Right Track, a 2007 series of tile murals by Jos Sances and Daniel Galvez, is located in the west entrance plaza. Moving Richmond by Mildred Howard consists of two bent weathering steel plates with poetry by Ishmael Reed on the side of the parking garage.

Although Richmond is a terminal station for BART, most connecting regional bus services instead run to El Cerrito del Norte station, which is much closer to I-80. Richmond station is served by several AC Transit bus services – local routes 70, 71, 72M, 74, 76, 376; several school routes; and all-night route 800 – all of which use the station busway. Flixbus intercity buses and local shuttles also use the busway. A Golden Gate Transit route over the Richmond–San Rafael Bridge connecting Richmond to the agency's main service area in North Bay ran until 2015, when it was combined with a route that terminates at El Cerrito del Norte station.

History

Southern Pacific and Santa Fe railroads
The Southern Pacific (SP)-controlled Northern Railway opened through the then-uninhabited swamplands near Point Richmond on January 8, 1878. Stops were soon established at San Pablo, north of what is now Richmond, and Stege in what is now the southeast corner of Richmond. By the mid-1880s, the SP established a flag stop at Barrett's station at modern-day Barrett Avenue. It was named for George H. Barrett, a local landowner whose house was nearby. By the turn of the century, Barrett's station was a three-sided shelter at which passengers could hail several daily trains. 

In 1902, Barrett's station was renamed Richmond to match the rapidly growing town. The SP built a new Richmond station on the north side of Macdonald Avenue in 1904. The old "shed" was demolished on August 18, 1904, with the new station – a single-story structure with an attached freight house – opened soon after. The SP began work on a new station, estimated to cost $11,000, in August 1914. It opened in September 1915, with the old station relocated west for use as a freight house. The new station was a larger wooden structure with porticos at both ends.

The East Shore and Suburban Railway (later a Key System subsidiary) opened from the Standard Oil refinery to the SP station on July 7, 1904. An extension eastwards along Macdonald Avenue opened in October 1905, crossing the SP tracks at grade. A city ordinance disallowed streetcars from crossing the SP tracks with passengers aboard, forcing passengers to cross the tracks on foot. A $35,000 contract was issued on September 1, 1907, for construction of an underpass to take Macdonald Avenue and the streetcars under the SP tracks. The underpass opened on May 10, 1908. Streetcars were replaced with Key System buses – later part of AC Transit – in 1933.

In 1900, the Atchison, Topeka and Santa Fe Railway (Santa De) made Ferry Point on Point Richmond the west terminus of its transcontinental mainline, where passengers could board ferries to San Francisco. A station was soon built at the west end of Macdonald Avenue next to the Santa Fe rail yard. It was a two-story wooden Craftsman style structure with a one-story portico on the southwest side and a one-story freight house on the northeast side. A small reading room for employees (later used as a trainmaster's office) was located nearby. 

On May 16, 1904, the Santa Fe opened a branch line from Richmond to Oakland. Santa Fe trains began connecting with SP ferries at the Oakland Mole on April 23, 1933, replacing the Point Richmond passenger ferries, though Ferry Point was used for freight until 1975. (On July 1, 1938, the Santa Fe reverted to its previous Oakland terminal, with buses to San Francisco using the newly opened Bay Bridge.) During expansion of the Richmond rail yard in 1944, the station and freight house were moved eastward; the portico was replaced with an extension of the station building, which was stuccoed. A station was also located at Richmond Avenue in the Point Richmond neighborhood from 1903 to 1918.

Even as intercity rail service began to decline, Richmond was served by SP trains on the Shasta Route, Overland Route, and Central Valley routes, plus Santa Fe service to the Central Valley. The Santa Fe branch to Oakland closed on June 15, 1958, leaving Richmond as the transfer point to buses to San Francisco. Santa Fe passenger service to Richmond ended entirely in 1968 when the Golden Gate was discontinued. The SP station building was closed on August 30, 1968, and demolished shortly afterward for BART construction, leaving passengers with only a platform. SP service to Richmond on the San Joaquin Daylight continued until May 1, 1971, when Amtrak took over intercity passenger service. The former Santa Fe station was controversially demolished in the 1990s during expansion of the yard by the Burlington Northern and Santa Fe Railway. The former reading room – the only remaining original building from the Santa Fe yard – was restored, relocated to Point Richmond, and reused as a business in 2006–07.

BART station

As early as 1957, Richmond was identified as a likely terminus for a line of a proposed regional rapid transit system. The Bay Area Rapid Transit (BART) system was approved by voters in November 1962. The station was originally to be located at 6th Street and Macdonald Avenue west of downtown, but this was changed to 16th Street and Nevin Avenue (along the SP line) to allow construction of a rail yard north of the station and permit future extension. After tension between the Bay Area Rapid Transit District and the city, an agreement to use the latter site was reached in May 1967. The tracks continued past the station to the rail yard; the grade crossing of Barrett Avenue – which was ranked the fifth-highest priority for elimination on a 1965 state list – was replaced with a road underpass.

Not until March 1969, when the state approved a temporary sales tax to cover the shortfall, could work begin on the contracts for the remaining stations including Richmond. In June 1968, the original design for an elevated concourse was replaced with an underground concourse in response to objections from city officials.

The station was built by Rothschild & Raffin, which also constructed the Richmond Yard and several other BART stations, at a cost of $2.3 million (equivalent to $ million in ). The construction of Richmond station was credited by local officials as the key piece of downtown redevelopment efforts. BART service to Richmond began on January 29, 1973; it has remained a terminus since. (An extension to Crockett was considered in 1991 but not pursued.) BART service to Richmond was initially only on the Orange Line. Some direct service to San Francisco (today’s Red Line) began in April 1976; all-day service began on July 7, 1980, after BART was able to reduce train spacing through the Transbay Tube.

Amtrak station

Unlike other large cities, the Bay Area did not have a convenient transfer location between Amtrak intercity service and local rapid transit; 16th Street station in Oakland was not located near a BART station. The introduction of the San Joaquin service in 1974 added a third round trip to the SP mainline north of Oakland. A $667,000 Amtrak station adjacent to the BART station opened for use by the San Joaquin plus the long-distance San Francisco Zephyr and Coast Starlight on October 30, 1977. It included two 18-car-long platforms, with stairs and an elevator from a small station building to the under-track passage.

Amtrak service gradually expanded; a second San Joaquin was added in 1980, and the Capitols (now Capitol Corridor) service began in 1991. Richmond was also served by the Spirit of California, which ran from 1981 to 1983. Disagreements between Caltrans and Amtrak over funding delayed the addition of a station agent until September 1982.

The Coast Starlight ceased to stop at Richmond in April 1996, followed by the California Zephyr (successor to the San Francisco Zephyr) in October 1998. Richmond was the only transfer point between Amtrak and BART until the Amtrak platform at Oakland Coliseum station (which is served only by the Capitol Corridor) opened in 2005.

Renovations

The Amtrak station building was closed on December 1, 1997, though trains continued to stop. On April 12, 2000, BART and the city broke ground on a "transit village", a large mixed-use transit-oriented development project adjacent to the station. In July 2001, the aging Amtrak facility was replaced with a modern island platform with better access to the BART pedestrian tunnel. The $1.9 million project, funded by the state, was intended to improve the station as preparation for the transit village. The developer for the transit village – which included a parking garage for BART – was chosen in 2002.

A $6.4 million renovation of the station was undertaken as part of the transit village project. The project included expanded entrances to the concourse, with a canopy over the west entrance. Richmond station was officially named the Richmond Transit Center at a dedication ceremony on October 18, 2007. A BART ticket window opened at the station in August 2008, joining seven other major stations in the system. The 750-space parking garage opened on May 30, 2013, with the surface lot on the east side of the station closed at that time.

The two long-distance trains began stopping at Richmond again on November 8, 2010. However, the Coast Starlight stop was again discontinued on January 14, 2013 because the train was scheduled to arrive at night – if it was several hours late, passengers would be unable to exit through the concourse, which is locked outside of BART service hours. In 2018, BART and CCJPA installed a "courtesy light" on the Amtrak platform, which will instruct northbound Capitol Corridor trains to hold for two minutes if a BART train is arriving to allow passengers to make their connection.

References

External links

Richmond – BART
Richmond – Capitol Corridor

Amtrak stations in Contra Costa County, California
Stations on the Orange Line (BART)
Stations on the Red Line (BART)
Bay Area Rapid Transit stations in Contra Costa County, California
Bus stations in Contra Costa County, California
Buildings and structures in Richmond, California
Railway stations in the United States opened in 1973
Railway stations in the United States opened in 1977
Transit centers in the United States
Former Southern Pacific Railroad stations in California